Naberezhny is a rural locality (a village) in Dyomsky Selsoviet, Bizhbulyaksky District, Bashkortostan, Russia. The population was 334 as of 2010. There are 6 streets.

Geography 
Naberezhny is located 34 km south of Bizhbulyak (the district's administrative centre) by road. Bikkulovo is the nearest rural locality.

References 

Rural localities in Bizhbulyaksky District